Yany Prado Torres (born 2 January 1991) is a Cuban actress. She is best known for playing Génesis in La doble vida de Estela Carrillo and Irma in La reina soy yo. In 2021, Prado starred on the Netflix's series Sky Rojo as Gina.

Life and career
Prado was born in Havana on 2 January 1991, but moved to Mexico at age eleven together with her family. She went to Televisa's Centro de Educación Artística where she studied acting. Her first television role was in 2010 in the Mexican series La rosa de Guadalupe as Carolina and other characters in the following years. Prado made her television comeback in 2017 in La doble vida de Estela Carrillo playing Génesis. The role gave her a nomination for Best Young Lead Actress at the 36th TVyNovelas Awards.

In 2018, she played La Negra in the Mexican TV series Tres Milagros, and, in 2019, she played La Luchis in Ringo and Irma in La reina soy yo.

In 2019, she was cast to play the role of Gina in the Netflix Spanish series Sky Rojo.

Filmography

Awards and nominations

Premios TVyNovelas

References

External links 
 
 

1991 births
21st-century Cuban actresses
Cuban telenovela actresses
Cuban television actresses
Living people